Ariège Pamiers XIII Pyrénées are a French Rugby league club based in Pamiers, Ariège department, Occitanie region. The club plays in the Midi-Pyrénées League in the French National Division 2.

Club honours
Elite 2
Winners - 1989

See also
National Division 2

References

External links
 Club Website

French rugby league teams
1964 establishments in France
Rugby clubs established in 1964